Eupithecia lamata is a moth in the family Geometridae. It is found in western China (Qinghai).

The wingspan is about 19 mm. The fore- and hindwings are pale brown buff.

References

Moths described in 2004
lamata
Moths of Asia